Bantu Village is an album by American trumpeter Blue Mitchell which features arrangements by Monk Higgins recorded and released on the Blue Note label in 1969.

Reception

The Allmusic review awarded the album 4 stars.

Track listing
All compositions by Dee Ervin and Monk Higgins except as indicated
 "H.N.I.C." (Blue Mitchell, Dee Ervin, Monk Higgins) - 5:18
 "Flat Backing" - 4:18
 "Na Ta Ka" (Fred Robinson) - 3:56
 "Heads Down" - 5:19
 "Bantu Village" - 3:46
 "Blue Dashiki" (Robinson) - 4:51
 "Bush Girl" (Virginia P. Bland, Dee Ervin) - 3:03
Recorded at RPM Studios, Los Angeles, California on May 22 (tracks 2, 4 & 6) and May 23 (tracks 1, 3, 5 & 7), 1969.

Personnel
Blue Mitchell, Bobby Bryant - trumpet
Monk Higgins - piano, percussion, conducting, arrangement
Buddy Collette - flute
Bill Green - flute, alto saxophone
Plas Johnson - tenor saxophone
Charlie Loper - trombone
Freddy Robinson, Al Vescovo - guitar
Dee Ervin - piano, percussion
Bob West (tracks 2, 4 & 6) - bass
Wilton Felder (tracks 1, 3, 5 & 7) - electric bass
John Guerin (tracks 2, 4 & 6), Paul Humphrey (tracks 1, 3, 5 & 7) - drums
King Errisson (tracks 1, 3, 5 & 7), Alan Estes (tracks 2, 4 & 6) - conga

References

Blue Note Records albums
Blue Mitchell albums
1969 albums
Albums conducted by Monk Higgins
Albums arranged by Monk Higgins